Uğur İbrahimhakkıoğlu (born oJuly 2, 1944 in İstanbul) is a high-ranked Turkish judge and the Secretary General of the Court of Cassation.

External links
  Uğur İbrahimhakkıoğlu at the official High Court of Appeals website 

1964 births
Lawyers from Istanbul
Turkish civil servants
Court of Cassation (Turkey) justices
Living people
Istanbul University Faculty of Law alumni